Plaeng Yao is a district (amphoe) of Chachoengsao province, central Thailand.

History
The minor district (king amphoe) Plaeng Yao was established on 16 October 1978 with the three tambons: Plaeng Yao, Hua Samrong, and Wang Yen from Bang Khla district. It was upgraded to a full district on 15 March 1985.

Geography
Neighboring districts are (from the west clockwise): Ban Pho, Bang Khla, Ratchasan, Phanom Sarakham, and Sanam Chai Khet of Chachoengsao Province; and  Ko Chan, Phanat Nikhom, and Phan Thong of Chonburi province.

Economy
Plaeng Yao is home to Toyota's Gateway Assembly Plant. It has been used to manufacture the Prius model.

Administration

Central administration 
Plaeng Yao district is divided into four sub-districts (tambons), which are further subdivided into 48 administrative villages (mubans).

Local administration 
There are four sub-district municipalities (thesaban tambons) in the district:
 Thung Sadao consisting of parts of sub-districts Plaeng Yao and Wang Yen.
 Plaeng Yao consisting of parts of sub-districts Plaeng Yao and Wang Yen.
 Hua Samrong consisting of parts of sub-district Hua Samrong.
 Wang Yen consisting of parts of sub-district Wang Yen.

There are three sub-district administrative organizations (SAO) in the district:
 Plaeng Yao consisting of parts of sub-district Plaeng Yao.
 Hua Samrong consisting of parts of sub-district Hua Samrong.
 Nong Mai Kaen consisting of sub-district Nong Mai Kaen.

References

External links
amphoe.com
Plang Yao profile at Department of Agricultural Extension

Plaeng Yao